Ogerta Manastirliu (born 31 December 1978) is an Albanian Socialist Party politician and the Member of Parliament (MP) for Tirana. On 13 March 2017, she was appointed as Minister of Health. She held the office until 21 May 2017, due to the general election.

Manastirliu was first elected as a member of parliament in the 2017 general election in the constituency of Tirana.

On 10 September 2017 she was reappointed to hold the portfolio of Ministry of Health and Social Protection in the Rama II Government.

Early life and career 

Ogerta Manastirliu was born in Tirana on December 31, 1978.

Manastirliu holds the title "Doctor of Science" in "Analytical Chemistry and Environment". Earlier she studied at the University of Tirana, at the Faculty of Natural Sciences, the General Chemistry branch, where she graduated and received the title "Master in Science" in the same branch. Since 2009 she has been engaged as an examiner at the Faculty of Natural Sciences.

In 2004 she started her professional career in the Municipality of Tirana, initially in the Project Coordination Directorate. From 2005 to 2011, she headed the Housing and Social Services Directorate. In this assignment, Manasterliu was one of the main contributors to the design and implementation of the "Local Housing Strategy".

From 2011 to 2013, she was engaged as an expert in managing and coordinating social and human resources policies for national and international organizations, such as UNFPA and Friedrich Ebert Stiftung.

She has a long activation in the ranks of the Socialist Party and is a member of the Parliament of Albania. In the parliamentary elections of 2017, she was first elected as deputy of the Albanian Parliament.

Manastirliu is fluent in English and Italian.

Plagiarism scandal
In October 2018, many public figures and politicians in Albania were involved in a plagiarism scandal involving their master's and Ph.D. theses. The denouncement of cases of plagiarism was started by Taulant Muka, a young epidemiologist educated in the Netherlands, who waged a crusade against the “fake” PhDs held by many politicians and government functionaries. This scandal, among other things, sparked nationwide protests from the students of public universities, requiring a vetting for all academic titles held by public figures, state officials and politicians.

Manastirliu was accused of having plagiarised her thesis. She rejected the accusations, stressing the authenticity of the doctorate work. She was supported by the university professor who had led the doctorate work.

Personal life 

She is married to Ermal Gjinaj; the couple has two daughters.

See also 
Council of Ministers
Socialist Party
Ministry of Health and Social Care

References

External links 
Manasterliu's Twitter profile
Ministry of Health and Social Care
Socialist Party of Albania

Socialist Party of Albania politicians
Members of the Parliament of Albania
Women members of the Parliament of Albania
University of Tirana alumni
21st-century Albanian politicians
1978 births
Living people
Government ministers of Albania
Women government ministers of Albania
Health ministers of Albania
21st-century Albanian women politicians